Lenakel is the largest town on the island of Tanna in Vanuatu. It has a population of 1,473.

It is located on the west coast of the island near the administrative capital of Isangel and serves as a major port of entry.

Language
It is the center of the Lenakel language, one of the five Tanna languages native to the island; Vanuatu's official tongue, the English creole Bislama is spoken as well.

References

Populated places in Vanuatu
Tafea Province